Kurt Kostecki (born 4 July 1998) is an Australian racing driver currently competing in the Dunlop Super2 Series in the No. 55 Holden VF Commodore for Kostecki Brothers Racing. He is also co-driving in the Pirtek Enduro Cup alongside Jake Kostecki in the No. 56 Ford Mustang GT for Tickford Racing.

Biography

Australia

Super2 Series
In December 2014, Kostecki became one of the youngest people to drive a V8 Supercar when, at the age of 16, he debuted in the Dunlop Series support race for the Sydney 500 for MW Motorsport. Failing to finish his first race and finishing 19th in the second, he was picked up by RSport. His season lasted four rounds, but with a best result of 14th he stepped down from the drive to focus on school studies and was replaced with privateer Phil Woodbury. The Kostecki family purchased two Gen2 Holden VF Commodore chassis from Triple Eight Race Engineering (who Kurt worked for as a third mechanic), running Kurt and brother Jake from 2016 onwards. His fortunes improved with six top 10 finishes (including two 4th placings) and 16th in the championship.
He finished eighth in the 2017 Super2 Series and is also competing full time in the 2018 Super2 Series. 
In 2019 he switched to Triple Eight Race Engineering finishing second in the championship.

Supercars Championship
In 2016, Kostecki was also gifted the unusual opportunity to drive for Team 18 at the Townsville and Ipswich rounds of the championship following extensive damage to the teams' original chassis and injury to driver Lee Holdsworth, seeing as he could provide the team a spare chassis. At Townsville he finished 25th in Race One and DNFed in Race Two, and in Ipswich he finished 23rd in Race One and 21st in Race Two.

For 2018, he is entered as a wildcard at round 9 at Queensland Raceway and round 11 The Bend SuperSprint driving a Holden VF Commodore.

United States
Kostecki was initially slated to run the second half of the 2014 NASCAR K&N Pro Series East alongside his cousin Brodie Kostecki, however this plan did not come to fruition.

Career results

Career summary

Complete Super2 Series results
(key) (Round results only)

Supercars Championship results
(key) (Races in bold indicate pole position) (Races in italics indicate fastest lap)

Complete Bathurst 12 Hour results

Complete Bathurst 1000 results

References

External links
 Profile at Driver DataBase
 Profile at Racing Reference
 News, pictures & video's at Motorsport.com

Living people
1998 births
Australian racing drivers
Racing drivers from Perth, Western Australia
Supercars Championship drivers
Australian Endurance Championship drivers
Andretti Autosport drivers
United Autosports drivers
Matt Stone Racing drivers